Preston Township is located in Richland County, Illinois. As of the 2010 census, its population was 1,247 and it contained 635 housing units.  Before May 2, 1859, this locale was known as Douglas Township.

Geography

Demographics

References

External links
City-data.com
Illinois State Archives

Townships in Richland County, Illinois
Townships in Illinois